Split-eyed owlfly refers to one of two tribes of the neuropteran owlfly family:
 Ascalaphini
 Ululodini